The  (Spanish for the "School of Concord" or "Agreement"), also known as the Patriotic Society of the Friends of the Country of Quito was an influential society in Spanish South America during the 1790s. It was centered in Quito, the capital of the Royal Audience of Quito, but also had members in Bogota, Guayaquil, Riobamba, and Ibarra. It promoted Enlightenment thought and nationalism in the discussion of regional affairs and is seen as a precursor to Quitonian independence as the Republic of Ecuador.

History
The society was inspired by the "Discourse to the Illustrious and Loyal City of Quito" published by the Quitonian native Dr.Eugenio de Santa Cruz y Espejo during his visit to the viceregal capital Bogota in 1789.

The society was founded two years later as the "Patriotic Society of the Friends of the Country" by 23 creoles and mestizos who met at the University of St Gregory the Great (now Quito's Metropolitan Cultural Center) on 30 November 1791. They pledged to meet once a week to address issues concerning education, science, agriculture, commerce, politics, and the arts. Under his editorship, it published the audience's first newspaper  in 1792. 

The group had expected royal approval but this was rejected via official decree on 11 November 1793. The group ceased official activity shortly thereafter, with Espejo's death ending the last of its operations by 1796.

Members

Legacy

Although the School of Concord was short-lived, it has been remembered in Ecuadorian history as an important precursor and harbinger of the local resistance that established Ecuador's independence over the next few decades and transferred political power from the Spanish to local creole elites.

See also
 History of Ecuador
 Economic Societies of the Friends of the Country

Notes

References

Citations

Bibliography
 .
 . 
 . 

History of Ecuador